El Hany Soliman (born 7 August 1984), is an Egyptian footballer who plays for Egyptian Premier League side Smouha as a goalkeeper.

El Hany has had numerous call-ups for Egypt's full national team, as substitute goalkeeper, including the qualifiers. In addition, he represented Egypt at all youth levels, he played with the U-17, U-20 and the U-23 teams.

References

1984 births
Living people
Egyptian footballers
Egypt youth international footballers
Egypt international footballers
Association football goalkeepers
Al Ittihad Alexandria Club players
El Gouna FC players
Sportspeople from Alexandria
Egyptian Premier League players
People from Alexandria